The 1985–86 National Hurling League (known as the Ford National Hurling League for sponsorship reasons) was the 55th season of the National Hurling League.

Division 1

Limerick came into the season as defending champions of the 1984-85 season. Clare and Dublin entered Division 1 as the promoted teams.

On 11 May 1986, Kilkenny won the title following a 3-11 to 2-5 win over Galway in the final. It was their first league title since 1982-83 and their 7th National League title overall.

Dublin and Laois were relegated from Division 1.

Kilkenny's Ger Fennelly was the Division 1 top scorer with 1-47.

Table

Group stage

Knock-out stage

Quarter-finals

Semi-finals

Final

Scoring statistics

Top scorers in a single game

Division 2

Down, Meath, Tipperary and Wexford entered Division 2 as the promoted and relegated teams from the previous season.

On 9 March 1986, Wexford secured the title following a 3-15 to 1-5 win over Kerry in the final round of the group stage. Westmeath secured promotion to Division 1 as the second-placed team.

Down and Roscommon were relegated from Division 2.

Table

Group stage

Division 3

Kildare, Louth and Waterford entered Division 3 as the promoted and relegated teams from the previous season.

On 9 March 1986, Mayo secured the title following a 0-12 to 0-8 win over Armagh in the final round of the group stage. Waterford secured promotion to Division 2 as the second-placed team.

Louth were relegated from Division 3.

Table

Division Four

Knock-out stage

References

National Hurling League seasons
League
League